Amalou may refer to,
Amalou, Algeria
Amalou, Morocco